Eriogonum thymoides is a species of flowering plant in the buckwheat family known by the common name thymeleaf wild buckwheat, or simply thymeleaf buckwheat.

Description
Old plants may have a gnarled woody base and sprawl more extensively. The hairy leaves are linear to spatulate and flat or rolled under, with blades up to 1.0 cm in length. Each flower stem has a whorl of small bract-like leaves near the midpoint and is topped by a head-like inflorescence up to 2 cm wide. The flower is up to 1 cm long and is variable in color, including yellow, white and rosy red, yellow and rosy red, and white. In bud, the flowers are often deep rosy red. The bases of the petals and sepals are covered with long hairs. The species is polygamodioecious, meaning that some of the plants have both male and bisexual flowers, while others have both female and bisexual flowers. Eriogonum thymoides can be distinguished from the similar to Eriogonum douglasii by its (usually) smaller leaf size, and by its involucre lobes, which are erect and appressed in E. thymoides, and spreading to reflexed in E. douglasii (the involucre is the bract that envelopes the base of the flower head).

Range and Habitat
Eriogonum thymoides is native to dry regions of Idaho, Oregon, and Washington in the Pacific Northwest of the United States, where there are three main population groups. It flowers in mid-spring. This plant grows in sagebrush, ponderosa pine forest openings, and mountain ridges. Though it grows in a restricted region it is locally abundant.

Uses
According to one source, this plant has "special value to native bees."

Gallery

References

External links

 USDA Plants Profile

thymoides
Flora of Idaho
Flora of Oregon
Flora of Washington (state)
Flora without expected TNC conservation status